Hilary McGrady (born in 1966) is a Northern Irish arts and cultural leader and environmentalist. She became Director-General of the National Trust in March 2018.

Early life and education 
Born in Lisburn, Northern Ireland, McGrady grew up during The Troubles in Northern Ireland. McGrady’s father was a builder, while her mother looked after Hilary and her two siblings. A career advisor at McGrady's school suggested she become a hairdresser, but she instead studied Graphic Design at art college.

Career 
After finishing her degree in Graphic Design, Hilary worked as a designer before moving into marketing, including as a Brand Manager for Diageo, the global drinks company. She moved into the charity sector, heading the Northern Irish organisation Arts & Business.

Belfast European Capital of Culture Bid 
Following the departure of Shona McCarthy, McGrady joined the Imagine Belfast 2008 team as Chief Executive to lead the city’s bid to become European Capital of Culture. Although the bid was unsuccessful, it led to the creation of a new a new Culture and Arts Plan 2003–2006 for the city, credited with boosting cultural activity and tourism.

National Trust 
In 2006 McGrady joined the National Trust as regional director for Northern Ireland. She later became Regional Director for Wales and the London and the South East region and in 2014 was appointed Chief Operating Officer, leading the Operations and Consultancy teams.

In December 2017 it was announced that McGrady would succeed Helen Ghosh as Director-General of the National Trust. She started the role in March 2018. She is the organisation’s first Director-General not to attend Oxbridge.

In 2020, the Trust celebrated its 125th anniversary, with McGrady announcing that the organisation would reach Net Zero carbon emissions by 2030, including the planting of 20 million trees. She also pledged to create 20 ‘green corridors’: connecting urban areas with wilder countryside for people and nature. The first of these was announced in Bath in 2022.

The majority of the anniversary celebrations were however cancelled due to the Coronavirus pandemic, with McGrady making a number of media interventions on the organisation’s financial losses, and the need for a sustainable recovery.

The publication of a research document exploring National Trust places’ links with slavery and colonialism in 2020 attracted controversy. McGrady revealed in January 2022 that she had received death threats, although hadn’t reported these to the police because this abuse ‘comes with the territory’.

Personal 
Hilary lives in County Antrim with her husband who she met at art college. Their relationship initially caused difficulty for her family who were Protestants and unionists, while her husband came from a Catholic, nationalist area. They have three grown-up children, a dog and 16 ducks. She lists her interests as the arts, gardening and hill walking.

References 

1966 births
Living people
National Trust people
People from Lisburn